St. Hovhannes Church was an Armenian church located in village of Chalkhangala (Kangarli District) of the Nakhchivan Autonomous Republic of Azerbaijan. It was located southeast of the village.

History 
The church was founded in the 12th or 13th century and was renovated in 1651 and in the 19th century.

Architecture 
The church was a single-nave structure with vaulted hall, a semicircular apse, and an entrance on the northern facade. There were Armenian inscriptions on the northern facade, and ornamentation on the bema.

Destruction 
The church was still extant in 2001, however, it was destroyed at some point between August 30, 2001, and July 15, 2011, as documented by Caucasus Heritage Watch.

See also 
St. Tovma Monastery (Chalkhangala)
St. Grigor Church (Chalkhangala)

References 

Armenian churches in Azerbaijan
Ruins in Azerbaijan
Armenian churches